The Galt Black Hawks were a junior ice hockey team based in Galt, Ontario, now a part of the city of Cambridge. They played in the Ontario Hockey Association from 1949 to 1955 and were operated as an affiliate of the Chicago Black Hawks. Their home arena was the Galt Arena Gardens.

The team had previously been affiliated with the Detroit Red Wings as the Galt Red Wings, and had also been known as the Galt Canadians, and the Galt Rockets. The sponsorship by the Chicago Black Hawks took over in 1949, and lasted until the team folded in 1955. The team's best players were quickly promoted to the NHL, leaving Galt with a dismal won/loss record while sponsored by the Chicago Black Hawks. The Galt Black Hawks had only one stellar season in 1951-52, finishing third place.

The best known former Black Hawk is Bobby Hull, who played for Galt in 1954-55. He is the only alumnus in the Hockey Hall of Fame as a player. Former alumnus Murray Costello was inducted as a builder as the long-serving president of the Canadian Amateur Hockey Association, a role he assumed after his retirement. The lone scoring champion form the Black Hawks would be Jim McBurney, who won the Eddie Powers Memorial Trophy in 1952–53 with 61 goals and 35 assists.

NHL alumni
From the Galt Black Hawks, twenty-one players graduated to play in the National Hockey League.

Bob Beckett
Les Binkley
Mike Buchanan
Chick Chalmers
Pete Conacher
Murray Costello
Warren Godfrey
Bronco Horvath
Bobby Hull
Hec Lalande
Jim McBurney
Hillary Menard
Tony Poeta
Jack Price
Matt Ravlich
Len Ronson
Don Simmons
John Sleaver
Floyd Smith
Kenny Wharram
Bob Wilson

Yearly Results

External links
 www.cambridgehockey.com - The History of Cambridge Hockey by Todd Jones
 Galt Arena Gardens - OHL Arena & Travel Guide
 Ontario Hockey League Official web site
 Canadian Hockey League Official web site

  
Sport in Cambridge, Ontario
Defunct Ontario Hockey League teams
Ice hockey clubs established in 1949
1949 establishments in Ontario
1955 disestablishments in Ontario
Chicago Blackhawks minor league affiliates
Ice hockey clubs disestablished in 1955